Waryam Singh Sandhu (born 10 September 1945) is an Indian author of short stories. In 2000, he was awarded the Sahitya Akademi Award for his short story collection Chauthi koot.  Although he writes in Punjabi,  his works have been translated into Hindi, Bengali, Urdu and English.

Early life
Sandhu was born in the village of Nanke in British Punjab in 1945. He was the oldest of six children; three brothers and two sisters. After graduating with a Bachelor of Education degree, he became a school teacher.

Career
Sandhu published his first story "Akhan Vich Mar Gayi Khushi" in the Punjabi magazine Preetlari. 
In 1998, he released Chauthi koot. In 2015, two stories from the collection were adapted into the film The Fourth Direction.

Sandhu, who holds a Doctor of Philosophy degree, retired as a lecturer from Lyallpur Khalsa College, Jalandhar. He entered into the arena of non-fiction after his retirement, penning several volumes about the Ghadar Party. In 2019, he returned his Sahitya Akademi Award in protest of the Modi administration.

Works

Short story collections
1971 Lohe De hath
1981 Ang sang
1987 Bhajian Bahin
1998 Chauthi koot
2000 Til Phul
 2021 Jamraud
 Apna Apna Hissa (Selected 15 stories)
Chonvian Kahanian (Jatt Di Jun)
..Til-Ful te Hor Kahania

Non-fiction
Kulwant Singh Virk Da Kahani Sansar 
Kushti Da Dhroo Tara-Kartar Singh 
Pardesi Panjab
..Vagdi-E-Ravi
..Novelkar Sohan Singh Seetal-Smaj-Shashtri pripekh
..Padhia-Vachia
..Sahitak-Swaijiwani
..Gupha Vichli Udaan
..Ghadri Jarnail Kartar Singh Sarabha
..Sahid Bhai Mewa Singh Lopoke
..Ghadar Lehar di Gatha
..Ghadri Babe Kaun San
..Ghadar Lehar da Choumukhia Chirag
Guru Nank Patshah nu MildiaN

Awards
1979 Hira Singh Dard Award 
1980 Bhai Veer Singh Purskar from Guru Nanak Dev University
1981 Punjab Sahit Academy Award 
1990 Sujan Singh Purskar
1992 Navtej Singh Purskar
1993 Manjit Yadgari Purskar Canada
1997 Waris-Shah Purskar-Punjabi Sath
1988 Kulwant Singh Virk Purskar
1999 Maulavi Ghulam Rasool Purskar
1999 Sahit Trust Dhudike Purskar
1999 Punjab Lok Sabhiacharik Manch Purskar
2000 Hashim Shah Purskar
2000 Pash Yadgari Purskar
2000 Kartar Singh Dhaliwal Purskar
2000 Sahitya Akademi Award for Punjabi
2001 Waris Shah Purskar-World Punjabi Conference Lahore
2002 Punjab Rattan Purskar
2003 Sharomani Punjabi Sahitkar Award-Bhasha Vibhag Punjab
2003 Waris Shah Purskar-World Punjabi Conference London
2019 Punjab Gaurav Purskar-Punjab Arts Council

References

Punjabi-language writers
Recipients of the Sahitya Akademi Award in Punjabi
Indian male short story writers
Academic staff of Guru Nanak Dev University
1945 births
Living people
People from Jalandhar
20th-century Indian short story writers
Writers from Punjab, India
20th-century Indian male writers